Hoorah may refer to:

 Oorah, a battle cry common in the United States Marine Corps since the mid-20th century
 An exclamation similar to Huzzah